Timea Bacsinszky and Tathiana Garbin were the defending champions but decided not to participate.

Anabel Medina Garrigues and Alicja Rosolska won the tournament beating Natalie Grandin and Vladimíra Uhlířová in the final, 6–2, 6–2.

Seeds

  Anabel Medina Garrigues /  Alicja Rosolska (champions)
  Natalie Grandin /  Vladimíra Uhlířová (final)
  Eva Birnerová /  Lucie Hradecká (quarterfinals)
  Andreja Klepač /  Tatiana Poutchek (semifinals)

Draw

Draw

References
 Main Draw

Poli-Farbe Budapest Grand Prix - Doubles
2011 Doubles